The Sidu River Bridge (Siduhe Bridge, 四渡河特大桥) is a  suspension bridge crossing the valley of the Sidu River near Yesanguan in Badong County of the Hubei Province of the People's Republic of China. The bridge was designed by CCSHCC Second Highway Consultants Company, Limited. and built at a cost of 720 million yuan (approximately US$100 million). It opened to traffic on November 15, 2009.

Geography
The bridge is part of the new G50 Huyu Expressway that parallels China National Highway 318, an east-west route between Shanghai and Chongqing, 
crossing the wide belt of mountains that separate the Sichuan Basin from the lowlands of eastern Hubei. The Yangtze River pierces the same mountain belt  to the north, forming the famous Three Gorges. The Yiwan Railway, completed in 2010 and running parallel to the highway, has been described as China's most difficult to build and most expensive (per km) rail line.

The bridge spans a  valley of the Sidu River (a left tributary of the Qingjiang River), and superseded the Royal Gorge Bridge and the Beipan River Guanxing Highway Bridge as the highest bridge in the world until it in turn was surpassed by the Duge Bridge in 2016.

Design and construction

The bridge's design includes H-shaped towers, a truss-stiffened main span, and unsuspended side spans. The Warren-type trusses were constructed in 71 sections with the largest section weighing .

The first part of the suspension cable installed, a rope known as the pilot cable, was the first-ever to be placed using a rocket. Conditions at the bridge's location would not allow the use of boats or helicopters, which have previously been used to string the first cable. The rockets carried the pilot cables across on October 6, 2006 and resulted in time and cost savings.

The main suspension cables are made of 127 parallel wire strands bundled into a hexagonal shape (127 is the sixth centred hexagonal number).  Each strand is made of 127 wires (also making a hexagonal shape so that there is a total of 16,129 wires in each of the two main suspension cables).  Each cable can hold .

Notes

References

External links

Suspension bridges in China
Bridges in Hubei
Bridges completed in 2009
2009 establishments in China
Badong County